The Potohar plateau, sometimes pronounced Pothohar Plateau, is a large region of plateau situated in northern Punjab, Pakistan. It is bounded on the east by the Jhelum River, on the west by the Indus River, on the north by the Kala Chitta Range and the Margalla Hills, and on the south by the Salt Range.

The region roughly covers the modern-day Punjab districts of Attock, Chakwal, and Rawalpindi Jhelum District (Partially) and the Islamabad Capital Territory.

Tribes of the region
The Pothohar region is home to a number of tribal groupings, many of whom occupy distinct tracts like Rajputs, Khattars,  Dhanials, Gujjars, Jatts, Mohyals, Qazi, Khatris, Abbasi, Bhattis, Janjuas, Hanjras, Syeds, Awans, Khokhars, Gakhars and others.

The anthropologist Pnina Werbner have confirmed the continuing strength of tribal feelings among emigrant Pothoharis in the United Kingdom. This region was and still is an important source of recruitment into the old colonial British Indian Army, and its successor, the Pakistan Army. Official recruitment policies have also encouraged the sense of tribal belonging among the Pothoharis.

References

History of Punjab